David Bell (born 13 May 1985 in Buncrana, County Donegal) is an Irish football player currently playing as a defender for Lisburn Distillery in the IFA Premiership.

Career
Bell was spotted by a Rushden and Diamonds scout at an early age whilst playing in an Ulster schools select team in an inter-provincial tournament and was snapped up by the club. He won caps for the Republic of Ireland under-17 - 19 under Sean McCaffrey and Brian Kerr. The left-sided player moved back to his native Ireland in 2004 where he joined St. Patrick's Athletic of Dublin. He spent 2 seasons in Dublin and made 30 appearances for the Premier League outfit. He can play in both defence and midfield.
   
Signing for Finn Harps at the beginning of the 2006 season, he made his debut against Kildare County on 18 March 2006. He played 34 games for the club, including 1 as a substitute. After spells at Institute and Limavady United, he joined Crusaders.

He made his debut for Crusaders in an Irish Cup tie against Bangor, and won the County Antrim Shield in just his second game.

He joined Carrick Rangers on loan in January 2011.

Honours
Crusaders
County Antrim Shield (1): 2009/10
Carrick Rangers
Ladbrokes.com Championship 1 (1): 2010/11
WKD Intermidiete Cup (1): 2010/11

References 

1985 births
Association footballers from County Donegal
Association football fullbacks
Crusaders F.C. players
Institute F.C. players
League of Ireland players
Living people
NIFL Premiership players
People from Buncrana
People from County Donegal
Republic of Ireland association footballers
Rushden & Diamonds F.C. players
St Patrick's Athletic F.C. players
Carrick Rangers F.C. players
Lisburn Distillery F.C. players
Limavady United F.C. players